NTN24 (acronym for Nuestra Tele Noticias 24) is a Colombian cable television news channel, owned by Grupo RCN and operated by RCN Televisión.

NTN24 was launched on 3 November 2008 with journalist Claudia Gurisatti appointed as the channel's first editorial director. Its main headquarters are located in Bogotá, Colombia.

External links
 Official Site

RCN Televisión
Television networks in Colombia
24-hour television news channels
Television channels and stations established in 2008
Spanish-language television stations